The 1979 Detroit Tigers finished in fifth place in the American League East with a record of 85-76, 18 games behind the Orioles. They outscored their opponents 770 to 738. The Tigers drew 1,630,929 fans to Tiger Stadium in 1979, ranking 7th of the 14 teams in the American League. This season is most notable for both the Tigers' involvement in the infamous  Disco Demolition Night, of which they were the visiting team to the Chicago White Sox and declared winners by forfeit, as well as for their mid-season hiring of Sparky Anderson as manager. Anderson would manage the Tigers through the end of the 1995 season, winning the 1984 World Series along with two American League Eastern Division titles in 1984 and 1987.

Offseason 
 March 20, 1979: Steve Dillard was traded by the Tigers to the Chicago Cubs for a player to be named later. The Cubs completed the deal by sending Ed Putman to the Tigers on March 24.

Regular season

Season standings

Record vs. opponents

Notable transactions 
 May 25, 1979: The Tigers traded a player to be named later to the Cincinnati Reds for Champ Summers. The Tigers completed the deal by sending Sheldon Burnside to the Reds on October 25.
 June 5, 1979: University of Michigan football quarterback Rick Leach was drafted by the Detroit Tigers in the 1st round (13th pick) of the 1979 Major League Baseball draft.
 July 20, 1979: Rusty Staub was traded by the Tigers to the Montreal Expos for a player to be named later and cash. The Expos completed the deal by sending Randy Schafer (minors) to the Tigers on December 3.

Roster

Player stats

Batting

Starters by position 
Note: Pos = Position; G = Games played; AB = At bats; H = Hits; Avg. = Batting average; HR = Home runs; RBI = Runs batted in

Other batters 
Note: G = Games played; AB = At bats; H = Hits; Avg. = Batting average; HR = Home runs; RBI = Runs batted in

Pitching

Starting pitchers 
Note: G = Games; IP = Innings pitched; W = Wins; L = Losses; ERA = Earned run average; SO = Strikeouts

Other pitchers 
Note: G = Games; IP = Innings pitched; W = Wins; L = Losses; ERA = Earned run average; SO = Strikeouts

Relief pitchers 
Note: G = Games pitched; W = Wins; L= Losses; SV = Saves; GF = Games finished; ERA = Earned run average; SO = Strikeouts

Awards and honors 
 Steve Kemp, Tiger of the Year Award, from Detroit baseball writers

All-Stars 
 Steve Kemp, reserve

League top ten finishes 
Steve Kemp
 #4 in AL in OPS (.939)
 #8 in AL in batting average (.318)

Ron LeFlore
 #2 in MLB in stolen bases (78)
 #3 in AL in singles (139)
 #4 in AL in times caught stealing (14)
 #5 in AL in triples (10)
 #7 in AL in runs scored (110)

Aurelio López
 #3 in AL in saves (21)
 #5 in AL in games finished (49)

Jack Morris
 #4 in AL in Adjusted ERA+ (133)
 #5 in AL in ERA (3.28)
 #5 in AL in wins (17)
 #5 in AL win percentage (.708)
 #4 in AL in hits allowed per 9 innings (8.15)

Bruce Robbins
 3rd youngest player in the AL

Alan Trammell
 #4 in AL in times caught stealing (14)

Milt Wilcox
 #2 in MLB in hit batsmen (11)

Players ranking among top 100 all time at position 
The following members of the 1979 Detroit Tigers are among the Top 100 of all time at their position, as ranked by The Bill James Historical Baseball Abstract in 2001:
 Lance Parrish: 19th best catcher of all time (played 12 games as a rookie)
 Lou Whitaker: 13th best second baseman of all time (played 11 games as a rookie)
 Alan Trammell: 9th best shortstop of all time (played 19 games as a rookie)
 Aurelio Rodríguez: 91st best third baseman of all time
 Ron LeFlore: 80th best center fielder of all time

Farm system 

LEAGUE CHAMPIONS: Evansville

Notes

References

External links 

 1979 Detroit Tigers Regular Season Statistics at Baseball Reference

Detroit Tigers seasons
Detroit Tigers season
Detroit Tiger
1979 in Detroit